The Frankford Junction train wreck occurred on September 6, 1943, when Pennsylvania Railroad's premier train, the Congressional Limited, crashed at Frankford Junction in the Kensington neighborhood of Philadelphia, Pennsylvania in the United States, killing 79 people and injuring 117 others.

Train

As it was the Labor Day Weekend in 1943, the company laid on 16-car trains to accommodate the expected high demand. At Washington's Union Station on Monday, September 6, 541 passengers boarded the 4 p.m. train, its 16 cars hauled by PRR GG1 electric locomotive number 4930, scheduled to travel nonstop to Pennsylvania Station, New York.

Incident
Everything appeared in order as the train passed through North Philadelphia station ahead of schedule and slowed its speed, but shortly afterward, as it passed a rail yard, workers noticed flames coming from a journal box (a hot box) on one of the cars  and rang the next signal tower at Frankford Junction, but the call came too late. Before the tower man could react, disaster struck as the train passed his signal tower at 6:06 pm traveling at a speed of 56 mph. The journal box on the front of car #7 seized and an axle snapped, catching the underside of the truck and catapulting the car upwards. It struck a signal gantry, which peeled off its roof along the line of windows "like a can of sardines". Car #8 wrapped itself around the gantry upright in a figure U. The next six cars were scattered at odd angles over the tracks, and the last two cars remained undamaged, with bodies of the 79 dead lying scattered over the tracks. As it was wartime, many servicemen home on leave were aboard who helped the injured. Workers from the nearby Cramp's shipyard arrived with acetylene torches to cut open cars to rescue the injured, a process that took until the following morning. The rescue work was directed by Mayor Bernard Samuel. The work of removing the dead was not complete until 24 hours after the accident.

Among the survivors was Chinese author Lin Yutang.

Inquiry
In total, 79 passengers died, all from cars #7 and #8, and 117 were injured, some seriously. The inquiry quickly established the overheated journal box as the cause of the accident, but railroad mechanics who had inspected and lubricated the box earlier that day swore it had been in good order. Normal practice was for signal towermen to watch passing train wheels for signs of problems and for train crew to look back as trains rounded curves. How this hot box escaped attention until too late has never been explained.

Similar incidents
This was not the first railroad accident in which an overheated journal box caused an axle to break and derail a train. The first-ever train wreck involving passenger fatalities, the Hightstown rail accident of 1833, had an identical cause.

71 years and 8 months later, along the same location, an Amtrak train, speeding over 100 mph, derailed along the curve. The 2015 Philadelphia train derailment claimed eight lives as well as injuring many others.

References

The Derailment of the Congressional Limited, Pennsylvania's Worst Railroad Disaster by Benjamin L Bernhart, publ Outer Station Project 2007,

External links
September 6, 1943 - The Wreck of the Congressional Limited at Philadelphia, Pa

 "100 Believed Dead in Wreck of Crack Congressional Train", The Milwaukee Sentinel, Sep 7, 1943
ICC Investigation No.2726

Railway accidents and incidents in Pennsylvania
Railway accidents in 1943
Derailments in the United States
Accidents and incidents involving Pennsylvania Railroad
Frankford Junction train wreck
History of Philadelphia
Frankford Junction train wreck